Statistics of Swiss Super League in the 1950–51 season.

Overview
It was contested by 14 teams, and Lausanne Sports won the championship.

League standings

Results

Sources 
 Switzerland 1950–51 at RSSSF

Swiss Football League seasons
Swiss
1950–51 in Swiss football